Call Out the Marines is a 1942 military comedy released by RKO in February 1942.  It stars Victor McLaglen and Edmund Lowe playing the same characters with different names that they played in What Price Glory? and several sequels; however the original film trailer mentions What Price Glory? and The Cock-Eyed World.  The film features extensive stock footage from RKO's Soldiers of the Sea that in some cases appear on process screens that the actors stand in front of.

Plot
Ex-Marines Jimmy McGinnis (Victor McLaglen) and Harry Curtis (Edmund Lowe), who haven't seen each other for fifteen years, meet at a racetrack.  They both immediately drop their jobs as an attendant and cleaner to rekindle their friendship and brawl over which one will have Violet (Binnie Barnes) for their girl.  When visiting a clip joint called the Shoreleave Cafe with Violet, they meet the owner, Jim Blake (Paul Kelly).  Blake was their former captain; he left the Corps under a cloud when he was blamed for a security breach.  Blake is involved in espionage, arranging to buy the plans for a new amphibious vehicle.

Jimmy and Harry are called back to active service as gunnery sergeants with the 6th Marines where they crash the spy ring.  The fast-paced comedy uses the spy plot as merely an excuse for five musical numbers by Harry Revel and a variety of comedy sequences, such as barroom brawls over thrown garters, spies and policemen with speech impediments, and jeep, motorcycle and car chases.

Cast
 Victor McLaglen as Jimmy McGinnis  
 Edmund Lowe as Harry Curtis  
 Binnie Barnes as Violet 'Vi' Hall  
 Paul Kelly as Jim Blake  
 Robert Smith as PFC Billy Harrison  
 Dorothy Lovett as Mary  
 Franklin Pangborn as Wilbur the Waiter  
 Corinna Mura as Zana Zaranda   
 George Cleveland as Bartender  
 The King's Men as Quartet   
 Nora Cecil As Elderly Woman With Glasses
 Florence Gill As Elderly Girl Who Wants To See Horses
 Six Hits and a Miss as Singing Group

Production
With the introduction of conscription in the United States and World War II in the news, the majority of American minor and major film studios made comedies about military service. RKO's Call Out the Marines had a troubled production history with different stars and technicians announced in trade papers of the time for the film.  The United States Marine Corps, which had initially cooperated with the producers, was outraged over the completed film in December 1941 and ordered the film shelved as "bad for morale".  However it was released after America entered the war.

References

External links 
 
 
 

1942 films
American black-and-white films
RKO Pictures films
Military humor in film
American spy comedy films
Films about the United States Marine Corps
World War II spy films
1940s spy comedy films
Films directed by William Hamilton (film editor)
1940s war comedy films
American war comedy films
1940s English-language films
1940s American films